Parides panares, the wedge-spotted cattleheart, is a species of butterfly in the family Papilionidae native to the Americas. The larvae feed on Aristolochia maxima and A. pilosa.

Subspecies
 P. p. panares (Gray, [1853]) (southeastern Mexico)
 P. p. erythrus (Rothchild & Jordan, 1906) (Panama to Colombia)
 P. p. lycimenes (Boisduval, 1836) (southeastern Mexico to Panama)
 P. p. paralius (Rothchild & Jordan, 1906) (Ecuador)
 P. p. rachelii K. S. Brown, 1994 (northern Venezuela)
 P. p. tachira T. Racheli, 1991 (southwestern Venezuela)

Description from Seitz

[panares panares = iphidamas in Seitz (misident.) Mexico] 
P. lycimenes. Male : somewhat smaller than P. vertumnus, the red area of the hindwing less 
triangular and its last spot smaller. Female: forewing slightly transparent at the apex; the spots somewhat yellowish, not
pure white, the cell-spot usually large and extended across the cell; band of the hindwing less bright red than in P. vertumnus. Tibiae of the male not thickened. Guatemala to Ecuador, in several subspecies. — lycimenes Boisd. is the Central American form. Forewing with a large green spot, which almost always encloses at least one white spot; often a spot in the cell; hindwing with 4—6 red spots. In the female the yellowish white spot before the 1.median much larger than the preceding one; band of the hindwing broad, almost always a uniform bright red. Guatemala to Panama; also on the small islands on the west coast of the Republic of Panama. — erythrus R. & J. (3d), male : the green spot broader than in the
preceding form, reaching to the hindmargin of the wing. Female: the spot before the 1.median of the forewing larger than in the preceding form; the band of the hindwing paler. Central and East Colombia and North Venezuela. — paralius R. & .J. (4a). Small, male : forewing with round yellow-white spot before the 2. median; band of the hindwing short and narrow. Female: spot on the forewing purer white than in the previous subspecies, the cell-spot reduced; the spot before the 2. median the largest; band of the hindwing almost straight. West Ecuador.

Description from Rothschild and Jordan(1906)
A full description is provided by Rothschild, W. and Jordan, K. (1906) See note on synonymy under Seitz (above).

Taxonomy

Parides  panares is a member of the anchises species group

The members are
Parides anchises 
Parides cutorina 
Parides erithalion 
Parides iphidamas 
Parides panares 
Parides phosphorus 
Parides vertumnus

References

Further reading

 

panares
Butterflies of Central America
Butterflies of North America
Papilionidae of South America
Taxa named by George Robert Gray
Butterflies described in 1853